The .50 Beowulf  is a 12mm caliber rifle cartridge developed by Bill Alexander of Alexander Arms for use in an AR-15 rifle.

Design and specifications
The cartridge utilizes a rebated rim, sized to match the rim of the 6.5mm Grendel round. The case body is very similar in dimensions to the .500 S&W Magnum revolver cartridge, being slightly longer and fully tapered for automatic feeding in the weapon.

The round is intended to improve stopping power greatly at short- to medium-range as compared to the standard 5.56×45mm NATO round. One of its advertised uses is at vehicle checkpoints, since the heavy bullet's flight path is not easily deflected by auto glass or standard vehicle body panels.

Design limitations

Proprietary status

The .50 Beowulf is a proprietary caliber developed as a specialized cartridge. Alexander Arms and Delta Firearms oversees all aspects of the production of the system and related accessories. Their reluctance to divulge information has been a source of irritation to some writers. Because Alexander Arms holds a trademark on the name .50 Beowulf, a number of other companies produce weapons and ammunition reverse engineered to the same dimensions under the name 12.7x42mm.

Sporting uses
Although much has been written about its tactical uses, the .50 Beowulf is gaining recognition as a sporting cartridge. It is becoming more widely recognized as being usable for a wide variety of North American game, including deer, moose, and black bear.

Similar cartridges
The cartridge has its lineage in the .50 Action Express, starting with the L.A.R. Grizzly and in modern times, the Magnum Research Desert Eagle pistol, with significant modification to improve functionality and safety in the AR-15 rifle.

See also
 Thumper concept
 List of AR platform cartridges
 List of rifle cartridges
 .458 SOCOM
 .450 Bushmaster
 .50 Alaskan
 12.7×55mm STs-130

Notes

External links
 .50 Beowulf General Technical Specifications  on the Alexander Arms website
 "Alexander Arms .50 Beowulf", Jeff Quinn, Gunblast.com (online magazine), July 8, 2002
 "Alexander Arms' New 'Overwatch' .50 Beowulf", Jeff Quinn, Gunblast.com (online magazine), June 15, 2003
 "More Punch for the AR-15", Anthony G. Williams, The Cartridge Researcher, the bulletin of the European Cartridge Research Association, May 2005
 "BFR .50 Beowulf Revolver", Jeff Quinn, Gunblast.com (online magazine), March 12, 2004

12.7 mm firearms
Pistol and rifle cartridges